Clara Pinto-Correia (born 30 January 1960) is a Portuguese-born novelist, journalist and educator.

The daughter of a physician, she was born in Lisbon and earned a doctorate in cellular biology from the University of Porto. She was an adjunct professor in Veterinary and Animal Sciences at the University of Massachusetts Amherst. She wrote a weekly column for the Portuguese newspaper Diário de Notícias.

In 1984, she published her first novel Watercress (Agrião), followed by Goodbye Princess (Adeus, Princesa) in 1985. Adeus, Princesa was made into a movie in 1992.

Recording from the Library of Congress 

 Clara Pinto Correia reading from her work

References 

1960 births
Living people
Portuguese women novelists
Portuguese journalists
Portuguese educators
20th-century Portuguese educators
20th-century Portuguese women writers
20th-century Portuguese writers
21st-century Portuguese educators
21st-century Portuguese women writers
21st-century Portuguese writers